Child of God is a 2013 American crime drama film co-written and directed by James Franco, and starring Scott Haze, based on the novel of the same name by Cormac McCarthy. It was selected to be screened in the official competition at the 70th Venice International Film Festival and was an official selection of the 2013 Toronto International Film Festival. The film made its United States premiere at the 51st New York Film Festival and then was screened at the 2013 Austin Film Festival.

Plot
Set in mountainous Sevier County, Tennessee, in the 1950s, Child of God tells the story of Lester Ballard.  Ballard is a dispossessed, violent man whom the narrator describes as "a child of God much like yourself perhaps."  Ballard's life is a disastrous attempt to exist outside the social order.  Successively deprived of parents and homes, and with few other ties, Ballard descends literally and figuratively to the level of a cave dweller, as he falls deeper into madness, crime and degradation.

Cast
 Scott Haze as Lester Ballard
 Tim Blake Nelson as Sheriff Fate
 James Franco as Jerry
 Jim Parrack as Deputy Cotton
 Fallon Goodson as Girly
 Vince Jolivette as Ernest
 Brian Lally as John Greer
 Boyd Smith as Mr. Fox

Production
On September 14, James Franco announced at the 2011 Toronto International Film Festival that he was set to direct an adaptation of Cormac McCarthy's third novel Child of God.

In January 2012, it was announced that Scott Haze had signed on to play Lester Ballard, the film's protagonist. It was also announced that Tim Blake Nelson and Jim Parrack had signed on to play Sheriff Fate and Deputy Cotton, respectively. Production on the film began on January 31, 2012, in West Virginia.

Reception
The film received mixed to negative reviews, holding a rating of 42% on review aggregator Rotten Tomatoes, with an average score of 4.90/10. The website's critical consensus states: "An obviously reverent adaptation that fails to make a case for the source material being turned into a movie, Child of God finds director James Franco outmatched by Cormac McCarthy's novel."

References

External links
 
 

2013 films
2013 crime drama films
American crime drama films
Films based on works by Cormac McCarthy
Films directed by James Franco
Films based on American novels
Films set in Appalachia
Films set in Tennessee
Films shot in West Virginia
Squatting in film
2010s English-language films
2010s American films